Eilema uniplaga is a moth of the  subfamily Arctiinae. It is found in Burma and on Borneo. The habitat consists of lowland forests.

References

 Natural History Museum Lepidoptera generic names catalog

uniplaga